John Archer (born Ralph Bowman; May 8, 1915 – December 3, 1999) was an American actor.

Early life
Archer was born Ralph Bowman in Osceola, Nebraska, the son of Eunice Melba (née Crawford) and Joseph Emmett Bowman. Archer moved to California at the age of five. He attended Hollywood High School and the University of Southern California, where he studied cinematography, expecting work behind the camera.

Radio
When finding work in the field of cinematography proved difficult Archer drifted into acting, working as a radio announcer and actor, including one year (beginning in 1944) in the starring role of Lamont Cranston in The Shadow, a role originally played by Orson Welles.

Stage
Archer honed his acting skills in plays at the Ben Bard Playhouse. He appeared on Broadway in The Odds on Mrs. Oakley (1944), One-man Show (1945), A Place of Our Own (1945), The Day Before Spring (1945-1946), This Time Tomorrow (1947), Strange Bedfellows (1948), and Captain Brassbound's Conversion (1950-1951).

Film
Archer made his film debut in 1938. He acted in films for Universal and Republic under his birth name. In a radio contest sponsored by Jesse L. Lasky on the program Gateway to Hollywood, he won the top prize, an RKO contract in the name of "John Archer." He appeared in the films: Hello, Frisco, Hello; Guadalcanal Diary; White Heat; Destination Moon; Rock Around the Clock; She Devil; Ten Thousand Bedrooms; Decision at Sundown; Blue Hawaii; and How to Frame a Figg.

Television
Archer appeared in television series such as Rescue 8, Science Fiction Theatre, Armstrong Circle Theatre, Dick Powell's Zane Grey Theatre, and The Millionaire, The Loretta Young Show, Private Secretary, The Bob Cummings Show, Mackenzie's Raiders, This Man Dawson, The Adventures of Ozzie and Harriet, The Californians, Sea Hunt, Maverick (in the series' only 2-part episode, titled "The Devil's Necklace"), The Twilight Zone, The Tall Man, Surfside 6 with Van Williams, 77 Sunset Strip, Wagon Train, Bat Masterson, Hawaiian Eye, McHale's Navy, The Silent Service, Bonanza, Hazel, Mannix, and The Name of the Game.

In 1960 Archer was cast as Joe Holman in the episode "Phantom Trail" of the western series Colt .45. He made five guest appearances on Perry Mason. He played Frank Maddox in the show's second episode in 1957, "The Case of the Sleepwalker's Niece". In 1958 he played murder victim Maj.  Frank Lessing in the episode "The Case of the Sardonic Sergeant", and in 1959 he played murderer J. R. Bradbury in the episode "The Case of the Lucky Legs". He also played murder victim Harry Arnold in the 1965 episode "The Case of Candy Queen".  He also made seven guest appearances on Lassie and six on Bonanza. He played the outlaw Matt Grundy in a 1962 episode of Laramie, entitled "The Confederate Express".

Personal life
Archer was married twice. From 1941 to 1955, he was married to actress Marjorie Lord. They had two children, including daughter actress Anne Archer. Archer had two children with his second wife, Ann Leddy, to whom he was married from 1956 until his death. Archer was a grandfather of Tommy Davis, son of his daughter Anne, both of whom are noted members of the Church of Scientology.

On December 3, 1999, Archer died from lung cancer in Redmond, Washington, at age 84.

Selected filmography

 Flaming Frontiers (1938) - Tom Grant
 Letter of Introduction (1938) - Reporter (uncredited)
 Dick Tracy Returns (1938) - Mr. Clark (uncredited)
 Overland Stage Raiders (1938) - Bob Whitney
 Spring Madness (1938) - Dartmouth College Student (uncredited)
 Career (1939) - Ray Cruthers
 Curtain Call (1940) - Ted Palmer
 Barnyard Follies (1940) - Jeff Hill
 Cheers for Miss Bishop (1941) - Richard Clark
 Scattergood Baines (1941) - Johnny Bones
 City of Missing Girls (1941) - James Horton
 The People vs. Dr. Kildare (1941) - Interne (uncredited)
 King of the Zombies (1941) - Bill Summers
 Paper Bullets (1941) - Bob Elliott
 Mountain Moonlight (1941) - Dr. Ed
 Always Tomorrow: The Portrait of an American Business (1941) - Jim Westlake
 Hi, Neighbor (1942) - Dr. Hall
 Police Bullets (1942) - Prof. J. Thomas Quincy
 Mrs. Wiggs of the Cabbage Patch (1942) - Dr. Robert Redmond (uncredited)
 Scattergood Survives a Murder (1942) - Dunker Gilson
 Bowery at Midnight (1942) - Richard Dennison
 Hello, Frisco, Hello (1943) - Ned Clark
 The Purple V (1943) - Jimmy Thorne
 Sherlock Holmes in Washington (1943) - Lt. Pete Merriam
 Shantytown (1943) - Bill Allen
 Crash Dive (1943) - Curly Bowman (uncredited)
 Guadalcanal Diary (1943) - Lt. Thurmond
 The Eve of St. Mark (1944) - Pvt. Carter
 Roger Touhy, Gangster (1944) - FBI Agent Kerrigan
 The Lost Moment (1947) - Charles
 After Nightfall (1949)
 Colorado Territory (1949) - Reno Blake
 White Heat (1949) - Philip Evans
 Destination Moon (1950) - Jim Barnes
 The Great Jewel Robber (1950) - Police Detective Lou Sampter
 High Lonesome (1950) - Pat Farrell
 Santa Fe (1951) - Clint Canfield
 Home Town Story (1951) - Don (uncredited)
 Best of the Badmen (1951) - Curley Ringo
 My Favorite Spy (1951) - Henderson
 The Big Trees (1952) - Frenchy LeCroix
 Rodeo (1952) - Slim Martin
 A Yank in Indo-China (1952) - Mulvaney
 Sound Off (1952) - Maj. Paul Whiteside
 The Sea Tiger (1952) - Ben McGrun
 The Stars Are Singing (1953) - Dave Parish
 Dragon's Gold (1954) - Mack Rossiter
 No Man's Woman (1955) - Harlow Grant
 Rock Around the Clock (1956) - Mike Dodd
 Emergency Hospital (1956) - Dr. Herb Ellis
 Affair in Reno (1957) - Tony Lamarr
 She Devil (1957) - Barton Kendall
 10,000 Bedrooms (1957) - Bob Dudley
 Decision at Sundown (1957) - Dr. John Storrow
 City of Fear (1959) - Lt. Mark Richards
 Blue Hawaii (1961) - Jack Kelman
 Apache Rifles (1964) - Col. Perry
 I Saw What You Did (1965) - John Austin
 How to Frame a Figg (1971) - Gerard
 The Little Sister (1986) - Warehouse Cop

References

External links

 
 
 
 
 
 

1915 births
1999 deaths
Male actors from Nebraska
People from Osceola, Nebraska
American male film actors
American male stage actors
American male television actors
People from Redmond, Washington
USC School of Cinematic Arts alumni
20th-century American male actors
RKO Pictures contract players
Deaths from lung cancer in Washington (state)